Steven Jonathan Carlip (born 1953) is an American professor of physics at the University of California, Davis. Carlip graduated from Harvard University with a Bachelor of Arts in physics in 1975. In 1987, he graduated from the University of Texas at Austin, with a Doctor of Philosophy under the direction of Bryce DeWitt. After a post-doctoral period at Institute for Advanced Study in Princeton, New Jersey, he has been teaching — since 1990 — at University of California, Davis.

Carlip was one of the recipients of the Department of Energy Outstanding Junior Investigator Award in the year 1991.

Works

Carlip, Steven, Quantum Gravity in 2+1 Dimensions, . Cambridge, UK: Cambridge University Press, December 2003.
Carlip, Steven, General Relativity: A Concise Introduction, . Oxford, UK: Oxford University Press, March 2019.

References

External links
 Carlip's publications at INSPIRE-HEP 
 Steven Carlip's webpage at UC Davis

21st-century American physicists
University of California, Davis faculty
1953 births
Living people
Theoretical physicists
Harvard College alumni
University of Texas at Austin College of Natural Sciences alumni